Alois Schwartz (born 28 March 1967) is a German football manager and former player, who last managed SV Sandhausen.

Managerial career
Schwartz was manager of Rot-Weiß Erfurt between 11 April 2003 and 30 June 2003 where he won one out of 10 matches. His first match was a 4–2 loss to Stuttgarter Kickers on 11 April 2003 and his only win was against Jahn Regensburg. He was replaced by René Müller.

Schwartz was manager of 1. FC Kaiserslautern II between 1 January 2007 to 9 September 2012. His first match was a 0–0 draw against Wehen Wiesbaden on 23 February 2007. He failed to win any matches during the 2006–07 season after only drawing three matches and losing 11. His first win came during the 2007–08 season against SC Idar-Oberstein on 1 August 2007. Kaiserslautern II finished in second place and was promoted back into the Regionalliga. Kaiserslautern II again finished in second place in 2008–09 season. Kaiserslautern II finished in eighth place in the 2009–10 season, fourth in 2010–11 season, and ninth in the 2011–12 season. He left Kaiserslautern II on 9 September 2012. Kaiserslautern II was in eighth place at the time Schwartz left the club.

While he was manager of Kaiserslautern II, he was manager of 1. FC Kaiserslautern between 4 May 2009 and 30 June 2009. Kaiserslautern won his first match against FC Augsburg and lost the remaining three.

Schwartz returned to Rot-Weiß Erfurt on 10 September 2012 and was there until 30 June 2013. His first match was a 2–0 win against 1. FC Saarbrücken on 15 September 2012. He finished with a record of 10 wins, nine draws, and 11 losses.

Schwartz took over SV Sandhausen on 1 July 2013. His first match was a 0–0 draw against VfR Aalen on 19 July 2013. In the 2013–14 season, Sandhausen finished in 12th place and were knocked out of the German Cup in the Round of 16 by Eintracht Frankfurt. In the 2014–15 season, Sandhausen finished 12th, for the second consecutive season, and were knocked out of the German Cup in the first round, losing 4–1 to Arminia Bielefeld. The season started with a five-match winless streak. In the 2015–16 season, Sandhausen finished in 13th place and were knocked out of the German Cup in the second round, after losing in a shoot-out to 1. FC Heidenheim. Schwartz took over at 1. FC Nürnberg on 25 June 2016. His final match as Sandhausen manager was a 3–1 loss to Greuther Fürth on 15 May 2016.

Schwartz took over at Nürnberg on 25 June 2016. His first match was a 1–1 draw against Dynamo Dresden on 6 August 2016. He was sacked on 7 March 2017. He finished with a record of eight wins, six draws, and 11 losses.

On 29 August 2017, Schwartz was appointed the new manager of Karlsruher SC. He was sacked on 3 February 2020.

In September 2021, he returned as head coach of 2. Bundesliga club SV Sandhausen. He was sacked in February 2023.

Personal life
His stepson Nico Müller is footballer by his former club FC 08 Homburg.

Managerial record

References

External links

1967 births
Living people
People from Nürtingen
Sportspeople from Stuttgart (region)
German footballers
German football managers
MSV Duisburg players
Stuttgarter Kickers players
Bundesliga players
1. FC Kaiserslautern managers
FC Rot-Weiß Erfurt managers
Wormatia Worms managers
2. Bundesliga managers
SC Pfullendorf players
SV Sandhausen managers
1. FC Nürnberg managers
Karlsruher SC managers
3. Liga managers
Association football midfielders
Footballers from Baden-Württemberg
Rot-Weiss Essen players
SV Waldhof Mannheim players
FC 08 Homburg players